In the Firelight is a 1913 American silent short silent film directed by Thomas Ricketts and based on a poem written by Marc Edmund Jones. The film stars Charlotte Burton, William Bertram, Ed Coxen, and George Field. Most of the supporting cast were one-off actors including Mabel Marmer and William Brumburg, Dolly Lester, and Abbott Lindsey.

External links

1913 films
1913 drama films
Silent American drama films
American silent short films
American black-and-white films
Films based on poems
1913 short films
Films directed by Tom Ricketts
1910s American films